The Viceroy of Norway (Constitutional Danish: Vice-Konge) was the appointed head of the Norwegian Government in the absence of the King, during the era of the Union between Sweden and Norway. The role was essentially the same as that of the Governor-general, which has led to confusion as to who filled which office. Decisive, however, is that the title of Viceroy could only be held by the crown prince, or his oldest son, when he had come of age. Commoners with a similar mandate were merely styled Statholder (Governor-general).

History
On 9 November 1814 the King appointed Crown Prince Carl Johan to the office, but it was vacated eight days later. Crown Prince Carl was the longest-serving Viceroy, sitting for about a year. The office was vacant most of the time, and it was ultimately abolished on 30 June 1891.

During the Kalmar Union, Christian II was viceroy from 1506 to 1513.

List of Viceroys (Sweden-Norway)

See also
Governor-general of Norway
List of Norwegian monarchs
List of Norwegian Prime Ministers
Union between Sweden and Norway

Sources 
The Norwegian government: Viceroy in Norway
The National Library of Norway: The Constitution of Norway, as of 4 November 1814 

Norwegian monarchy
Political history of Norway
Political history of Sweden
United Kingdoms of Sweden and Norway
 

no:Visekonge#Norge